For the U.S. Casablanca Records subsidiary label, please see Chocolate City Records.

Chocolate City is a Nigerian record label founded in 2005 by lawyer Audu Maikori, along with Paul Okeugo and Yahaya Maikori. Generally regarded as one of the most successful indigenous urban record labels in Africa, Chocolate City operates as a subsidiary of Chocolate City Group. Other arms of the group include Chocolate City Distribution, Chocolate City Events, CCX, and Chocolate City Media. On 28 March 2019, Warner Music Group announced a partnership with the label. Under the partnership, Chocolate City artists will join WMG's repertoire and receive the support of the company's distribution and artist services via its independent label services division, ADA.

The label has been home to recording artists such as M.I Abaga, Femi Kuti, Nosa, Dice Ailes, Blaqbonez, ClassiQ, CKay, Candy Bleakz, Torna and Dijay Cinch. Artists formerly signed to the label include Victoria Kimani, Ice Prince, DJ Caise, DJ Lambo, Jeremiah Gyang, Ruby Gyang, Pryse, Brymo, Koker, Jesse Jagz, Lemon Adisa, Mr. Gbafun, Ijay, and Kahli Abdu & VHS Safari. Chocolate City has also worked on the careers of artistes such as Djinee and Asa. In 2012, business mogul and philanthropist Hakeem Bello-Osagie joined the board of Chocolate City Group as its chairman. Chocolate City’s influence on the evolution of the Nigerian music industry has been documented by Reuters International. The label is currently headed by Mr Abuchi Peter Ugwu, who took over from M.I Abaga.

History

Founded as a nightclub in 1997, Chocolate City quickly became the number one promotions outfit in the Northern part of Nigeria and moved into the industry mainstream in 2005 with the launch of the record label (Chocolate City Music). In 2001, Audu Maikori and Paul Okeugo founded the Guild of Artistes and Poets which was called an "arts appreciation society" which held weekly meetings which focused on the arts, music, poetry and creativity as a means of youth engagement and empowerment.

Under the leadership of MI, Chocolate City expanded by creating sub labels that included 100 Crowns which discovered and signed Blaqbonez and UpNorth Records which signed Classiq and Dijay Cinch, had its first ever press conference where every artiste were present to answer questions from members of the press. The press conference was planned to be on a monthly basis, but it only had been held once

In March 2019, Chocolate City signed a worldwide distribution deal with Warner Music Group.

G.A.P
The G.A.P later became one of the new age art renaissance movements which quickly gained membership in Jos, Abuja, and Lagos with a combined membership of over 3000 attendees at its peak. The GAP brought to light the need for artists to have better representation, which Audu gave in the form of pro bono legal services, and this eventually led to his registering Chocolate CIty with his bonus earnings from his job as a lawyer with the chambers of Afe Babalola and co. The first act to be signed to the Chocolate City label was multi talented instrumentalist, vocalist, songwriter and producer Jeremiah Gyang (whose debut album Na BA KA sold over 4 Million copies and won numerous accolades and acclaim for the artist as well as the label).

Na Ba Ka was known for its instrumentals which was studied by a Canadian University on Sound Engineering and Production and was even listed on the top ten charts in Israel between 2005 and 2006.

Chocolate City went on to discover and manage the careers of Djinee, M.I, Aṣa, Jesse Jagz, Ice Prince, Brymo and other artists who have won over 70 awards both locally and internationally.

In June 2007, Audu Maikori won the British award the International Young Music Entrepreneur of the Year (IYMEY) by the British Council, making Nigeria the first country to win two global awards in the Young Creative Entrepreneurs Series (the first was Lanre Lawal (IYDEY) 2005), after beating nine countries including the Philippines, Latvia, Lithuania, Indonesia, India, Malaysia, Tanzania, Egypt and Poland.

Accolades
Chocolate City was the first Nigerian music company to attain a global music award and recognition by the British Council in 2007: International Young Music Entrepreneur of the Year (IYMEY) 2007.

Chocolate City has since worked closely with the federal government of Nigeria as well as several international organisations such as the British Council in promoting the creative industries as well as capacity-building projects in and around Nigeria. In April 2008, Chocolate City announced a major collaborative effort in partnership with the British Council and the Ministry of Culture and Tourism to take a delegation of Nigerian music stakeholders to London Calling 2008 in a bid to open new vistas for the fast-growing Nigerian music industry currently valued at around $500 Million (2007). The 40-man delegation was led by the Minister of Culture and Tourism.

Chocolate City has also been active in the promotion of the Creative industries globally, having participated in several workshops and initiatives. In January 2008, Chocolate City delivered a keynote address on a workshop tagged "Mapping the Creative Industries in Albania" organised by the British Council, Ministry of Culture and Tourism and Ministry of Economy, Albania. The workshop was aimed at sharing experiences of creative entrepreneurs from around Europe, the UK and Nigeria.

Reuters International produced a documentary on the Chocolate City success story tagged "Music and Money" in recognition of its contributions to the development of the Nigerian music industry.

Over the years, Chocolate City has set up partnerships with many international and regional creative industry organisations, with affiliates in South Africa, U.K. and the US, the Ministry of Culture and Tourism and the British Council toward promoting and celebrating creativity in Nigeria.

On 8 December 2011, parent company Chocolate City Group won the African Awards for Entrepreneurship, beating over 3,300 applicants from 48 countries in Africa to clinch the runner-up prize, thereby making history as the first entertainment company to win the prize since 2007.

Chocolate City won the "Best Record Label of the Year" award in both 2013 & 2015 at the City People Entertainment Awards. At the 2011 edition of the aforementioned awards, the record label won the "Record Label of the Year" award.

In April 2015, Maikori stepped down after 10 years of piloting the affairs of the label and appointed M.I. to take over as the CEO of Chocolate City Music label while Ice Prince became the Vice President of Music for the label 

Maikori assumed the position of Group CEO of Chocolate City Group, which comprised Chocolate City Music (Record Label), Chocolate City Media, CCX Lounge (live music venue franchise), Bean Agency (an experiential marketing company) and Replete Publishing (A music publishing and distribution company).  Paul Okeugo was also appointed Group COO for the group.

In October 2019 M.I Abaga stepped down as CEO of Chocolate City Music. Aibee Abidoye was subsequently promoted to Executive Vice President for Chocolate City Group - her portfolio includes Music licensing, distribution and artist projects. On April 19, 2021, Abuchi Ugwu, a long time manager of M.I Abaga, sound engineer and producer, was appointed as substantive CEO of Chocolate City Music Ltd.

Awards and nominations

International Young Music Entrepreneur of the Year Award-Global Winner, 2007
Record Label of the Year - City People Entertainment Awards, 2011
Best Music Company - Effzye Awards, 2011
Africa Awards for Entrepreneurship  by Legatum 2011- Africa Awards

Artist roster

Management

Current artists

Former artists

Discography

Notes

References

External links

Companies based in Lagos
Event management companies of Nigeria
Hip hop record labels
Nigerian record labels
Record labels established in 2005